Blank endorsement of a financial instrument, such as a cheque, is only a signature, not indicating the payee. The effect of this is that it is payable only to the bearer – legally, it transforms an order instrument ("pay to the order of (the payee)") into a bearer instrument ("pay to the bearer"). It is one of the types of endorsement of a negotiable instrument.

It is "an endorsement consisting of nothing but a signature and allowing any party in possession of the endorsed item to execute a claim."

A blank endorsement is a commonly known and accepted term in the legal and business worlds.

This is also called an endorsement in blank or blank endorsement. 

The prevalent spelling in American English is endorsement; the minority convention, indorsement, is found in older American documents, although the revised Uniform Commercial Code Article on negotiable instruments retains the older spelling.

See also

Banking
Bearer bond
Bearer instrument
Blank cheque
Draft
Negotiable instrument
Forged endorsement
Promissory note

References

Negotiable instrument law